Victor Kassim Isa Oyofo was elected Senator for the Edo North Senatorial District of Edo State, Nigeria at the start of the Nigerian Fourth Republic, running on the People's Democratic Party (PDP) platform. He took office on 29 May 1999.
 
After taking his seat in the Senate he was appointed to committees on Petroleum, Solid Minerals, Environment (vice chairman), Police Affairs, Commerce and Niger Delta.

Personal
He is married to Oyinkansola Oyofo who was born in 1959. They married in 1981.

References

Living people
People from Edo State
Peoples Democratic Party members of the Senate (Nigeria)
20th-century Nigerian politicians
21st-century Nigerian politicians
Year of birth missing (living people)